Paulo de Faria is a municipality in the state of São Paulo, Brazil. The city has a population of 8,959 inhabitants and an area of 738.4 km². Paulo de Faria belongs to the Mesoregion of São José do Rio Preto.

Ecological estate
The ecological estate founded under the decree 17,724 (June 23, 1981) is a stational floral park and covers an area of 435 ha (4.35 km²). Situated by the Grande River (near Água Vermelha), characterizes several hills with the elevations around 400 to 495 m. The flowers features jatobá among others.

References

Municipalities in São Paulo (state)